The Firm were a British rock supergroup formed in 1984, featuring singer Paul Rodgers, guitarist Jimmy Page, drummer Chris Slade, and bass player Tony Franklin. The band released two albums in 1985 and 1986 and eventually saw their greatest chart success with the songs "Radioactive", "All the King's Horses", and "Satisfaction Guaranteed".

History
In the early 1980s, Page and Rodgers were both dealing with the demise of their respective bands, Led Zeppelin and Bad Company. "Jimmy was at a bit of a loose end," recalled Rodgers of the band's formation. "He'd come round and check out my home studio and we ended up writing songs, but without any definite plans. Jimmy was very keen to get on the road, so we put a band together… The first thing I knew was that he had to be writing songs again. I'd already seen one of my friends going down that road in Koss, and it wasn't going to happen again." They initially wanted to form a band with Yes and King Crimson drummer Bill Bruford and bass player Pino Palladino but both were under contract with other acts. 

Page and Rodgers refused to play material by their former bands and instead opted for a selection of Firm songs plus tracks from their solo albums; however, at least one performance of "Midnight Moonlight" featured sections of "White Summer" and "Kashmir", originally recorded by Page's former bands The Yardbirds and Led Zeppelin, respectively. The new songs were heavily infused with a soulful and commercially accessible sound, courtesy of Franklin's fretless bass guitar underpinning an understated song structure. Despite refusing to play old material, the last track from The Firm, "Midnight Moonlight", was originally an unreleased Led Zeppelin song entitled "Swan Song". This caused some critics to claim that Page had begun to run out of ideas. On the other hand, both albums and especially tours were met with largely positive and enthusiastic responses by fans of both lead members' previous bands.

In subsequent interviews, Page and Rodgers both indicated that the band was never meant to last more than two albums. After the band split, Page and Rodgers returned to solo work while Chris Slade joined AC/DC in 1989 and Franklin teamed up with guitarist John Sykes and drummer Carmine Appice in Blue Murder.

Band members
Paul Rodgers – lead vocals, rhythm guitar, acoustic guitar, piano
Jimmy Page – lead guitar, acoustic guitar, violin bow, backing vocals
Tony Franklin – fretless bass, keyboards, synthesizer, backing vocals
Chris Slade – drums, percussion, backing vocals

Films, DVDs
The Firm Live at Hammersmith 1984 (1984) (limited release video)
5 from the Firm (1986)

Official tours
Europe (29 November 1984 – 9 December 1984)
USA (1985)
The band played only two UK concerts on this tour: one at Middlesbrough Town Hall, and one at the London Hammersmith Odeon. In  addition to Firm songs, the band played solo material by Rodgers and Page. This included Paul Rodgers singing "Live in Peace" from his earlier solo album. 
United States (14 March 1986 – 28 May 1986)

Discography

Studio albums

Singles

References

English hard rock musical groups
British supergroups
Jimmy Page
Musical groups established in 1984
Musical groups disestablished in 1986
Musical quartets
Rock music supergroups
Paul Rodgers